Mohamed Mousa Abbas Ali (Arabic: محمد موسى; born on March 23, 1986) is a Qatari footballer of Sudanese descent who currently plays for Al-Duhail.

Club career statistics
Statistics accurate as of 13  January 2023

1Includes Emir of Qatar Cup.
2Includes Sheikh Jassem Cup.
3Includes FIFA Club World Cup.

International career
On November 5, 2010, the defender earned a call-up for the Qatar national under-23 football team, for the Asian Games.

International goals
Scores and results list Qatar's goal tally first.

References

1986 births
Living people
Al Sadd SC players
Umm Salal SC players
Lekhwiya SC players
Al-Duhail SC players
2015 AFC Asian Cup players
Qatar international footballers
Association football defenders
Qatari footballers
Footballers at the 2010 Asian Games
Qatari people of Sudanese descent
Sudanese emigrants to Qatar
Naturalised citizens of Qatar
Qatar Stars League players
Asian Games competitors for Qatar
Qatar youth international footballers